Pavel Yevgenyevich Bashkin (born September 1, 1978 in Astrakhan) is a Russian handball player who competed in the 2004 Summer Olympics. In 2004 he was a member of the Russian team which won the bronze medal in the Olympic tournament.

External links
 
 

1978 births
Living people
Sportspeople from Astrakhan
Russian male handball players
Russian expatriate sportspeople in Spain
Olympic handball players of Russia
Handball players at the 2004 Summer Olympics
Olympic bronze medalists for Russia
Medalists at the 2004 Summer Olympics
Olympic medalists in handball